Sung is a khum (commune) of Samlout District in Battambang Province in north-western Cambodia.

Villages

 Chamkar Chek
 Kandal
 Kanh Chaang
 Sre Reach
 Shoung Muoy
 Shuong Pir

References

Communes of Battambang province
Samlout District